Ian Toynton (born 1946) is a British television director, producer and editor.

Early life and education
Toynton was educated at Haberdashers' Aske's Boys' School, Elstree

Career in television
Ian Toynton is an Executive Producer/Director who started his TV career in the UK before moving to the States in the mid nineties. He has directed almost two hundred hours of television drama and has been nominated for a Primetime Emmy Award for 24 and has a British Academy of Film and Television Arts nomination for the British mini-series 'Widows'.

He also writes the children's illustrated book series 'Hooligan Bear'.

External links

Living people
People educated at Haberdashers' Boys' School
American television producers
American television directors
1946 births
American film editors